Yakuhananomia fulviceps is a species of beetle  in the genus Yakuhananomia of the family Mordellidae. It was described in 1891.

References

Mordellidae
Beetles described in 1891